Ralph Van Deman Magoffin (1874 – 1942) was an American Classical scholar and archaeologist.

He received his B.A. from the University of Michigan and his Ph.D. from Johns Hopkins University.

In 1907 Magoffin was a Fellow of the American Academy in Rome, during which time he studied the topography of ancient Praeneste. Magoffin taught Ancient history and Archaeology at Johns Hopkins University. He was from 1920 to 1921 affiliated with the American Academy in Rome and from 1923 to 1930 served as chair of the Department of Classics at New York University. From 1921 to 1931 he served as president of the Archaeological Institute of America.

Magoffin was the nephew of Esther Boise Van Deman.

Publications
 1908. A study of the topography and municipal history of Praeneste. (Johns Hopkins University studies in historical and political science, ser. 26., no. 9-10.) Baltimore: The Johns Hopkins Press. Available online at Project Gutenberg.
 1929. (with Emily Cleveland Davis). ''The Romance of Archaeology, formerly Magic Spades.

References

External links
 
 

1874 births
1942 deaths
American archaeologists
Classical archaeologists
American classical scholars
Presidents of the Archaeological Institute of America
University of Michigan alumni
American expatriates in Italy
Johns Hopkins University faculty
New York University faculty